Anna Šabatová (born 23 June 1951) is a Czech politician, and former ombudsman of the Czech Republic. She was a signatory to Charter 77 and its spokesperson in 1986. Šabatová was awarded the United Nations Prize in the Field of Human Rights in 1998. She received the Czech Medal of Merit (First Grade) in 2002. In 2014, Šabatová was elected as the ombudsman of the Czech Republic, replacing Pavel Varvařovský.

In October 2020, she ran for the Senate in Brno but lost in the second round.

References

1951 births
Living people
Politicians from Brno
Charter 77 signatories
People of the Velvet Revolution
Recipients of Medal of Merit (Czech Republic)
Ombudsmen in the Czech Republic